Pablo Daniel Echarri (born September 21, 1969) is a leading Argentine actor.

Biography 
He was born in  Sarandí, Avellaneda, Buenos Aires

Career 
Pablo Echarri began his career on Argentine television in 1993. He was given his first significant film role in the 1998 thriller, The Detour, and received his first major film award at the Havana Film Festival for Best Actor for his role in Only People, in 1999. He was further honored by the Spanish Actors Union for his 2005 role in The Method, and in Argentina in 2006 for Chronicle of an Escape in both cases portraying the film's chief antagonist.

Personal life 
He married fellow Argentine actress Nancy Dupláa in 2007, and the couple has two children.

External links
 
 

1969 births
Living people
Argentine male actors
Argentine people of Basque descent
People from Avellaneda